The Princess of Neutralia (German: Die Prinzessin von Neutralien) is a 1917 German silent comedy film directed by Rudolf Biebrach and starring Henny Porten, Paul Bildt and Hermann Picha.

Plot
After a wealthy young woman rejects the proposals of 115 suitors, they form a club to try to gain revenge on her.

Cast
 Henny Porten  
 Paul Bildt   
 Hermann Picha   
 Alexander Antalffy   
 Julius Falkenstein   
 John Gottowt
 Rudolf Biebrach (likely uncredited)

References

Bibliography
 Jung, Uli & Schatzberg, Walter. Beyond Caligari: The Films of Robert Wiene. Berghahn Books, 1999.

External links

1917 films
Films of the German Empire
German silent feature films
German comedy films
Films directed by Rudolf Biebrach
German black-and-white films
1917 comedy films
Silent comedy films
1910s German films